The Bangladesh Premier League (BPL) is a professional Twenty20 league in Bangladesh. 2012 was the inaugural season of this tournament. The league consists of six teams from six different cities. This is a list of the squads of all franchises for the 2012 edition.

Dhaka Gladiators
This is the full squad of Dhaka Dynamites for the inaugural season.

Khulna Royal Bengal
This is the full squad of Khulna Royal Bengals for the inaugural season.

Chittagong Kings
Full squad of Chittagong Kings for the inaugural season.

Barisal Burners
Full squad of Barisal Burners for the inaugural season.

Sylhet Royals
Full squad of Sylhet Royals for the inaugural season.

Duronto Rajshahi
Full squad of Duronto Rajshahi for the inaugural season.

References

2012 Bangladesh Premier League